The Lost World: Jurassic Park is an action-adventure video game developed by Appaloosa Interactive, and published by Sega for the Sega Genesis. It was released on September 16, 1997. By this time the Genesis was near the end of its commercial lifespan, and months went by between new software releases for the console.
 
The Lost World: Jurassic Park is based on the film of the same name, which in turn is based on the novel by Michael Crichton.

Gameplay 
Unlike the previous Jurassic Park games for the Genesis, the game features a bird's-eye view perspective similar to Jurassic Park on the Super NES.

The player assumes the role of an unnamed character who must capture dinosaurs on Isla Sorna, while stopping rival hunters from transporting dinosaurs to the mainland. The game consists of nineteen missions spread across four sections of the island, referred to as Sites One through Four. Boss levels must be played at the end of each Site in order to advance to the next Site.

Two players can work together in Cooperative Mode, or work against each other in Competitive Mode. Weapons such as a taser, tranquilizer gun, shotgun and grenades can be used against hunters and dinosaurs. At times, the player can control vehicles such as an SUV and a hovercraft.

Development
The game was originally scheduled to release in August 1997. This was pushed to September 1997.

Reception
Game Informer gave the game an 8.25 out of 10 and wrote, "We can honestly say that this game is more fun than the PlayStation/Saturn version. [...] We'd love to see more titles like The Lost World for Genesis. It's entertaining and pushes the Genesis to its limits." Game Informer also praised the game's graphics, but noted "when there's a lot of on-screen action, the slow down does become frustrating." GamePro instead considered the graphics unimpressive by Genesis standards, citing muted colors, simple backgrounds, and small sprites. The reviewer also described the gameplay as boring.

See also
Jurassic Park video games
The Lost World: Jurassic Park (video game), a listing of games based on The Lost World: Jurassic Park

References

External links

1997 video games
Cooperative_video_games
Jurassic Park video games
Video games based on adaptations
Sega Genesis games
Sega Genesis-only games
Video games developed in Hungary
Video games set in Costa Rica
Video games set on fictional islands